Grand Ayatollah Sheikh Hossein Wahid Khorasani (born Mohammad-Hossein Molla-Saleh‎; 1 January 1921) is an Iranian author and Shia marja'.

He is the current head of the Qom Seminary. Khorasani is considered to be the most learned Shia religious authority alive.

Early life and education 
Khorasani was born in Nishapur, a city 130 km west of Mashhad, to Sheikh Esmail Khorasani, a revered alim and orator.

He began his religious education at an early age in Mashhad, completing his muqadamat and Arabic under Sheikh Shams and al-Muhaqiq al-Mughani in the Ba'in Ya school. He then moved to the Mirza Jafar school and completed his intermediate level studies under Sheikh Husayn Birsi, Mirza Ahmed Kifaei, Abu al-Qasim al-Hakim al-Ilahi and Sheikh Husayn-Ali al-Isfahani. He also attended the classes of Mirza Mehdi al-Isfahani, Sheikh Mahdi al-Ishtiyani and Sheikh Muhammad Nahawndi. He received an ijaza from his teacher Sayyid Muhammad Hujjat Kuh-Kamari.

He moved to Najaf in 1949 and studied in the Yazdi school for ten years. He attended the classes of Sheikh Muhammad-Husayn Naini for a year; Abu al-Hasan al-Isfahani for two years; Sheikh Musa Khonsari for six years; Agha Dhiya al-Din al-Iraqi, Sayyid Jamal al-Din al-Golpayegani, Sheikh Kadhim al-Shirazi, Sayyid Abd al-Hadi al-Shirazi and Sayyid Muhsin al-Hakim. He studied under Sayyid Abu al-Qasim al-Khoei the longest, which was twelve years, becoming one of the distinguished students of al-Khoei.

He returned to Mashhad in 1972, and taught there for just under a year, and then travelled to Qom, to settle there until today.

Fatimah's death 
Khorasani believes the attack of Fatimah's house holds a very high religious significance in the Shi'i creed. He leads a large mourning procession in Qom, on the anniversary of her death–in accordance to the third narration– annually, that sees hundreds of thousands of people participating in it.

When the controversial marja' Sayyid Muhammad-Husayn Fadhlallah declared his opinion that the attack of the door was a myth, and deemed most stories as fiction, Khorasani along with Mirza Jawad Tabrizi and Sayyid Muhammad-Sadiq Rohani deemed him a "deviant".

Islamic Republic 
Khorasani stance on Iran's government has been relatively vague, and he has been considered–if anything–an indirect critic. He has been often quoted in his lectures to challenge the opinion of the supreme leader of Iran.

Works

Khorasani has written many books some of which have been translated into Urdu, Persian, Arabic, English, and other languages.

Some of his works include:

Principles of Faith. .
Sharh al-Urwatul Wuthqa (Explanation of The Firmest Bond).
Laws of Hajj.

Rulings of Medicine.
Ahkam-e-Shabab (Laws for Youth).
Misbah al-Huda Wa Safinat al-Najat (Light of Guidance and Ark of Salvation). Two Volumes.

Personal life 
Khorasani is married and has two sons, Mohammad-Esmail and Mohsen.

He is the father-in-law of Sadeq Larijani.

See also
Ali al-Sistani
Abu al-Qasim al-Khoei
Muhammad Hossein Naini 
Muhammad Kazim Khurasani
Mirza Husayn Tehrani
Abdallah Mazandarani
Mirza Ali Aqa Tabrizi
Mirza Sayyed Mohammad Tabatabai
Seyyed Abdollah Behbahani
Umar at Fatimah's house
Mohammad Sadiq Rouhani
Jawad Tabrizi

References

External links
  (in Arabic).
 Library of Khorasani's books by al-Feker E-book Network.

1921 births
Living people
Iranian centenarians
Iranian grand ayatollahs
Critics of Sunni Islam
Men centenarians
People from Nishapur